In mathematics, a variable (from Latin variabilis, "changeable") is a symbol that represents a mathematical object. A variable may represent a number, a vector, a matrix, a function, the argument of a function, a set, or an element of a set.

Algebraic computations with variables as if they were explicit numbers solve a range of problems in a single computation. For example, the quadratic formula solves any quadratic equation by substituting the numeric values of the coefficients of that equation for the variables that represent them in the quadratic formula. In mathematical logic, a variable is either a symbol representing an unspecified term of the theory (a meta-variable), or a basic object of the theory that is manipulated without referring to its possible intuitive interpretation.

History

In ancient works such as Euclid's Elements, single letters refer to geometric points and shapes. In the 7th century, Brahmagupta used different colours to represent the unknowns in algebraic equations in the Brāhmasphuṭasiddhānta. One section of this book is called "Equations of Several Colours".

At the end of the 16th century, François Viète introduced the idea of representing known and unknown numbers by letters, nowadays called variables, and the idea of computing with them as if they were numbers—in order to obtain the result by a simple replacement. Viète's convention was to use consonants for known values, and vowels for unknowns.

In 1637, René Descartes "invented the convention of representing unknowns in equations by x, y, and z, and knowns by a, b, and c". Contrarily to Viète's convention, Descartes' is still commonly in use. The history of the letter x in math was discussed in a 1887 Scientific American article.

Starting in the 1660s, Isaac Newton and Gottfried Wilhelm Leibniz independently developed the infinitesimal calculus, which essentially consists of studying how an infinitesimal variation of a variable quantity induces a corresponding variation of another quantity which is a function of the first variable. Almost a century later, Leonhard Euler fixed the terminology of infinitesimal calculus, and introduced the notation  for a function , its variable  and its value . Until the end of the 19th century, the word variable referred almost exclusively to the arguments and the values of functions.

In the second half of the 19th century, it appeared that the foundation of infinitesimal calculus was not formalized enough to deal with apparent paradoxes such as a nowhere differentiable continuous function. To solve this problem, Karl Weierstrass introduced a new formalism consisting of replacing the intuitive notion of limit by a formal definition. The older notion of limit was "when the variable  varies and tends toward , then  tends toward ", without any accurate definition of "tends". Weierstrass replaced this sentence by the formula

in which none of the five variables is considered as varying.

This static formulation led to the modern notion of variable, which is simply a symbol representing a mathematical object that either is unknown, or may be replaced by any element of a given set (e.g., the set of real numbers).

Notation
Variables are generally denoted by a single letter, most often from the Latin alphabet and less often from the Greek, which may be lowercase or capitalized. The letter may be followed by a subscript: a number (as in ), another variable, a word or abbreviation of a word or a mathematical expression. Under the influence of computer science, some variable names in pure mathematics consist of several letters and digits. Following René Descartes (1596–1650), letters at the beginning of the alphabet such as a, b, c are commonly used for known values and parameters, and letters at the end of the alphabet such as (x, y, z) are commonly used for unknowns and variables of functions. In printed mathematics, the norm is to set variables and constants in an italic typeface.

Since c occurs in a term that is a constant function of x, it is called the constant term.

Specific branches and applications of mathematics have specific naming conventions for variables. Variables with similar roles or meanings are often assigned consecutive letters or the same letter with different subscripts. For example, the three axes in 3D coordinate space are conventionally called x, y, and z. In physics, the names of variables are largely determined by the physical quantity they describe, but various naming conventions exist. A convention often followed in probability and statistics is to use X, Y, Z for the names of random variables, keeping x, y, z for variables representing corresponding better-defined values.

Specific kinds of variables
It is common for variables to play different roles in the same mathematical formula, and names or qualifiers have been introduced to distinguish them. For example, the general cubic equation

is interpreted as having five variables: four, which are taken to be given numbers and the fifth variable,  is understood to be an unknown number. To distinguish them, the variable  is called an unknown, and the other variables are called parameters or coefficients, or sometimes constants, although this last terminology is incorrect for an equation, and should be reserved for the function defined by the left-hand side of this equation.

In the context of functions, the term variable refers commonly to the arguments of the functions. This is typically the case in sentences like "function of a real variable", " is the variable of the function ", " is a function of the variable " (meaning that the argument of the function is referred to by the variable ).

In the same context, variables that are independent of  define constant functions and are therefore called constant. For example, a constant of integration is an arbitrary constant function that is added to a particular antiderivative to obtain the other antiderivatives. Because the strong relationship between polynomials and polynomial function, the term "constant" is often used to denote the coefficients of a polynomial, which are constant functions of the indeterminates.

This use of "constant" as an abbreviation of "constant function" must be distinguished from the normal meaning of the word in mathematics. A constant, or mathematical constant is a well and unambiguously defined number or other mathematical object, as, for example, the numbers 0, 1,  and the identity element of a group. Since a variable may represent any mathematical object, a letter that represents a constant is often called a variable.

Other specific names for variables are:
 An unknown is a variable in an equation which has to be solved for.
 An indeterminate is a symbol, commonly called variable, that appears in a polynomial or a formal power series. Formally speaking, an indeterminate is not a variable, but a constant in the polynomial ring or the ring of formal power series. However, because of the strong relationship between polynomials or power series and the functions that they define, many authors consider indeterminates as a special kind of variables.
 A parameter is a quantity (usually a number) which is a part of the input of a problem, and remains constant during the whole solution of this problem. For example, in mechanics the mass and the size of a solid body are parameters for the study of its movement. In computer science, parameter has a different meaning and denotes an argument of a function.
 Free variables and bound variables
 A random variable is a kind of variable that is used in probability theory and its applications.

All these denominations of variables are of semantic nature, and the way of computing with them (syntax) is the same for all.

Dependent and independent variables

In calculus and its application to physics and other sciences, it is rather common to consider a variable, say , whose possible values depend on the value of another variable, say . To simplify formulas, it is often useful to use the same symbol for the dependent variable  and the function mapping  onto . For example, the state of a physical system depends on measurable quantities such as the pressure, the temperature, the spatial position, ..., and all these quantities vary when the system evolves, that is, they are function of the time. In the formulas describing the system, these quantities are represented by variables which are dependent on the time, and thus considered implicitly as functions of the time.

Therefore, in a formula, a dependent variable is a variable that is implicitly a function of another (or several other) variables. An independent variable is a variable that is not dependent.

The property of a variable to be dependent or independent depends often of the point of view and is not intrinsic. For example, in the notation , the three variables may be all independent and the notation represents a function of three variables.

Examples
If one defines a function f from the real numbers to the real numbers by

then x is a variable standing for the argument of the function being defined, which can be any real number.

In the identity

the variable i is a summation variable which designates in turn each of the integers 1, 2, ...,  n (it is also called index because its variation is over a discrete set of values) while n is a parameter (it does not vary within the formula).

In the theory of polynomials, a polynomial of degree 2 is generally denoted as ax2 + bx + c, where a, b and c are called coefficients (they are assumed to be fixed, i.e., parameters of the problem considered) while x is called a variable. When studying this polynomial for its polynomial function this x stands for the function argument. When studying the polynomial as an object in itself, x is taken to be an indeterminate, and would often be written with a capital letter instead to indicate this status.

Example: the ideal gas law 
Consider the equation describing the ideal gas law, 

This equation would generally be interpreted to have four variables, and one constant.

One could rearrange this equation to obtain  as a function of the other variables,

One could approach this function more formally and think about its domain and range: in function notation, here  is a function .

However, in an experiment, in order to determine the dependence of pressure on a single one of the independent variables, it is necessary to fix all but one of the variables, say . This gives a function

Mathematically, this constitutes a partial application of the earlier function . 

This illustrates how independent variables and constants are largely dependent on the point of view taken. One could even regard  as a variable to obtain a function

Moduli spaces 

Considering constants and variables can lead to the concept of moduli spaces. For illustration, consider the equation for a parabola, 

The set of points  in the 2D plane satisfying this equation trace out the graph of a parabola.

That is, they specify coordinates on the 'space of parabolas': this is known as a moduli space of parabolas.

Conventional variable names

 a, b, c, d (sometimes extended to e, f) for parameters or coefficients
 a0, a1, a2, ... for situations where distinct letters are inconvenient
 ai or ui for the i-th term of a sequence or the i-th coefficient of a series
 e for Euler's number
 f, g, h for functions (as in )
 i for the imaginary unit
 i, j, k (sometimes l or h) for varying integers or indices in an indexed family, or unit vectors
 l and w for the length and width of a figure
 l  also for a line, or in number theory for a prime number not equal to p
 n (with m as a second choice)  for a fixed integer, such as a count of objects or the degree of an equation
 p for a prime number or a probability
 q for a prime power or a quotient
 r for a radius, a remainder or a correlation coefficient
 t for time
 x, y, z for the three Cartesian coordinates of a point in Euclidean geometry or the corresponding axes
 z for a complex number, or in statistics a normal random variable
 α, β, γ, θ, φ for angle measures
 ε (with δ as a second choice) for an arbitrarily small positive number
 λ for an eigenvalue
 Σ (capital sigma) for a sum, or σ (lowercase sigma) in statistics for the standard deviation
 μ for a mean

See also
 Lambda calculus
 Observable variable
 Physical constant
 Propositional variable

References

Bibliography

 
 
 
 
 
 
 
 
 
 

 
Algebra
Calculus
Elementary mathematics
Syntax (logic)
Mathematical logic